Anthony Hugh "Buddy" Jackson II (born March 3, 1989) is a Canadian football cornerback for the Edmonton Eskimos of the Canadian Football League (CFL). He played college football at the University of Pittsburgh and attended Cypress Bay High School in Weston, Florida. Jackson has been a member of six NFL teams; Indianapolis Colts, Washington Redskins, New York Giants, Kansas City Chiefs, Pittsburgh Steelers, and Dallas Cowboys. Elsewhere in the CFL Jackson has also been a member of Calgary Stampeders, Saskatchewan Roughriders  and BC Lions.

Early years
Jackson was a three-year varsity letterman for the Cypress Bay High School Lightning, starting two years at cornerback. He also participated in basketball and track, where he was a district champion in the 100-metre dash.

College career
Jackons played for the Pittsburgh Panthers from 2008 to 2011. He was redshirted in 2007. He recorded 34 total tackles, four pass break-ups and one fumble recovery his senior year.

Professional career

Indianapolis Colts
Jackson signed with the Indianapolis Colts of the National Football League (NFL) on April 30, 2012 after going undrafted in the 2012 NFL Draft. He was waived/injured by the Colts on August 15, 2012.

Washington Redskins
On November 12, 2012, Jackson was signed to the practice squad of the Washington Redskins' of the NFL.

New York Giants
Jackson signed a futures contract with the NFL's New York Giants on January 25, 2013. He was released by the Giants on May 11, 2013.

Kansas City Chiefs
Jackson was claimed off waivers by the Kansas City Chiefs of the NFL on May 14, 2013. He was released by the Chiefs on August 1, 2013.

Pittsburgh Steelers
Jackson was claimed off waivers by the Pittsburgh Steelers of the NFL on August 1, 2013. He was released by the Steelers on August 10, 2013.

Calgary Stampeders
Jackson spent the 2013 CFL season on the Calgary Stampeders' practice roster. He made his CFL debut on June 28, 2014, starting against the Montreal Alouettes. He started 12 games at cornerback, recording 42 tackles, during the 2014 CFL season. Jackson was on the injury list for six games.

Dallas Cowboys
On December 22, 2015, Jackson was signed to the practice squad of the Dallas Cowboys' of the NFL. He was released by the Cowboys on May 6, 2016.

Saskatchewan Roughriders
Jackson signed with the CFL's Saskatchewan Roughriders on June 21, 2016. Jackson played six games for the Riders in 2016, contributing 21 tackles.

BC Lions
Jackson signed with the BC Lions of the CFL on February 14, 2017. In one season in BC Jackson accumulated 17 defensive tackles, four special teams tackles and recorded his first career interception.

Edmonton Eskimos 
On February 28, 2018 Jackson signed with the Edmonton Eskimos (CFL).

References

External links
Calgary Stampeders bio 
NFL Draft Scout

Living people
1989 births
Players of American football from Florida
American football defensive backs
Canadian football defensive backs
African-American players of American football
African-American players of Canadian football
Pittsburgh Panthers football players
Indianapolis Colts players
Washington Redskins players
New York Giants players
Kansas City Chiefs players
Pittsburgh Steelers players
Calgary Stampeders players
Dallas Cowboys players
Saskatchewan Roughriders players
BC Lions players
People from Plantation, Florida
Edmonton Elks players
21st-century African-American sportspeople
20th-century African-American people
Sportspeople from Broward County, Florida
Players of Canadian football from Florida